Barech (also Baraich, Bareach, Barreach) is a Pashtun tribe in southern Kandahar province of Afghanistan. The Barech live primarily in Shorawak District.

References

Bibliography 
 
 

 
Sarbani Pashtun tribes
Durrani Pashtun tribes
Social groups of Pakistan
Ethnic groups in Kandahar Province